The name Neneng has been used for fourteen tropical cyclones in the Philippines by PAGASA and its predecessor, the Philippine Weather Bureau, in the Western Pacific.

 Typhoon Faye (1963) (T6313, 28W, Neneng) – a long-tracked Category 3-equivalent typhoon which struck Hong Kong, killing 3 people.
 Tropical Depression Neneng (1967) – a weak system only tracked by the Philippine Weather Bureau.
 Typhoon Harriet (1971) (T7112, 12W, Neneng) – traversed the Philippines and made landfall near the demilitarized zone between North and South Vietnam as a Category 4-equivalent typhoon, causing at least 5 fatalities and rendering 14 others as missing.
 Typhoon Flossie (1975) (T7516, 19W, Neneng) – a Category 1-equivalent typhoon which caused the sinking of two freighters, claiming 44 lives.
 Typhoon Judy (1979) (T7911, 13W, Neneng) – an intense typhoon which struck China and South Korea, leading to the deaths of 111 people.
 Tropical Storm Herbert (1983) (T8312, 13W, Neneng) – a tropical storm which struck Vietnam, resulting to 40 fatalities.
 Typhoon Gerald (1987) (T8714, 14W, Neneng) – deadly typhoon which approached Taiwan and struck China, killing 127.
 Typhoon Kinna (1991) (T9117, 19W, Neneng) – relatively strong mid-season typhoon that struck western Japan, leading to the loss of 11 lives.
 Typhoon Ward (1995) (T9518, 26W, Neneng) – a powerful typhoon which stayed at sea.
 Severe Tropical Storm York (1999) (T9915, 21W, Neneng) – struck China and Hong Kong, becoming the strongest storm to affect the latter in 16 years.
 Severe Tropical Storm Bebinca (2006) (T0616, 19W, Neneng) – a relatively strong tropical storm which initially did not affect land but claimed the lives of 33 people off the coast of Honshu after becoming an extratropical low.
 Typhoon Phanfone (2014) (T1418, 18W, Neneng) – a strong typhoon which struck Japan, killing 11.
 Tropical Storm Barijat (2018) (T1823, 27W, Neneng) – a tropical storm which affected northern Philippines and southern China, causing minimal damage.
 Typhoon Nesat (2022) (T2220, 23W, Neneng) – a typhoon which affected the Philippines, Taiwan, and Vietnam.

Pacific typhoon set index articles